The Kimpton Fitzroy London is a historic five-star hotel, located on Russell Square, Bloomsbury, in the London Borough of Camden. From its opening in 1900 until 2018, it was known as the Hotel Russell.

History

The Hotel Russell was built in 1898 by the architect Charles Fitzroy Doll and opened in 1900. It is distinctively clad in decorative thé-au-lait ("tea with milk") terracotta and was based on the Château de Madrid near the Bois de Boulogne in Paris.

Its restaurant, which was originally named after the architect but is now called Neptune, is said to be almost identical to the RMS Titanic's dining room, which he designed. Also in the hotel is "Lucky George", a bronze dragon on the second floor stairs. An identical copy was on the Titanic.

Known for its palatial design, the hotel's fixtures and fittings included an ornate Pyrenean marble staircase and an interior sunken garden. Each room was fitted with an en-suite bathroom, a great innovation at the time. A sister hotel by the same architect, the Imperial Hotel, was also built on Russell Square, but it was demolished in the late 1960s.

The life-size statues of four Queens - Elizabeth I, Mary II, Anne and Victoria - above the main entrance were the work of the sculptor Henry Charles Fehr. The façade, by Doll, incorporates the coats of arms of the world's nations (as they were in 1898) in the spandrels of the first floor.

The hotel was one of the few that were not taken over by the War Office during the Second World War. It survived the war largely intact, but the magnificent dome that stood on the roof was badly damaged in an air raid of 1941 and not replaced.

The Russell Group of universities is named after Hotel Russell, where the first informal meetings took place.

On 16 April 2018, the hotel reopened as The Principal London after an extensive renovation by the Principal Hotel Company. In July 2018, the Principal Hotel Company sold 12 hotels in its portfolio (including The Principal London) to Covivio Hotels, which then licensed their management to InterContinental Hotels Group. The hotel was renamed the Kimpton Fitzroy London on 24 October 2018.

The interior features contemporary design by lead designer Tara Bernerd & Partners. The bedrooms are decorated with a design by British textile artist Kit Miles.

In popular culture
The Hotel Russell is mentioned in Andrew Lloyd Webber's musical Cats during the song "The Journey to the Heaviside Layer".

The Hotel Russell is used as a location in the 1981 miniseries Kessler.

Gallery

See also 
 Hotels in London

References

External links

 

Kimpton hotels
Hotels in London
Grade II* listed buildings in the London Borough of Camden
Buildings and structures in Bloomsbury
Hotels established in 1900
Hotel buildings completed in 1900